Air Senok (Pvt) Ltd is a domestic carrier based in Sri Lanka specializing in various charter services such as passenger transport, emergency medical evacuation, Aerial advertising, photography and filming.
Their main base of operations is at the Ratmalana Airport in Colombo, Sri Lanka. They operate three Airbus H125 helicopters.

History
Commenced Operations in 2011 as a full subsidiary of Senok Trade Combine Ltd.

Fleet
Air Senok operates a fleet of Eurocopter aircraft manufactured by Airbus Industries.

References

Airlines of Sri Lanka
Airlines established in 2011
Sri Lankan companies established in 2011